Synersaga atriptera is a moth in the family Lecithoceridae. It is found in China (Guangdong).

The wingspan is 29–31 mm. The forewings are dark brown, with a black discal spot at the discal cell, one indistinct black spot below it and a reniform discocellular spot at the end of the cell. There is a broad and blackish transverse outer line and the termen is covered with dark brown scales. The hindwings are dark brown, the termen and posterior edge covered with long dark brown scales. Distinction between this species and others is made by wing venation and male genitalia.

Etymology
This species name refers to the deep black ground color of the hindwings and is derived from Latin atri- (meaning deep black) and pteron (meaning wing).

References

Moths described in 2014
atriptera